This is a list of current and former members of Aosdána, an association of artists whose work is deemed to have made an outstanding contribution to the creative arts in Ireland.

Details of membership
Membership of Aosdána is based on a system of peer nomination and election and is limited to a maximum of 250 living artists who must be resident in the Republic of Ireland or Northern Ireland for five years, although there exist exceptions where artists resident outside of Ireland are eligible "if the body of their work is deemed to significantly benefit the arts in Ireland".

Saoi
Members of Aosdána may be elected by other members to receive the honour of Saoi for singular and sustained distinction in the arts. Not more than seven members can hold this honour at any one time.

Members

References

! 
Aosdána